Permissive hypercapnia is hypercapnia (i.e. high concentration of carbon dioxide in blood) in respiratory insufficient patients in which oxygenation has become so difficult that the optimal mode of mechanical ventilation (with oxygenation in mind) is not capable of exchanging enough carbon dioxide. Carbon dioxide is a gaseous product of the body's metabolism and is normally expelled through the lungs.

In acute respiratory distress syndrome (ARDS), decreasing the tidal volume on the ventilator (usually 6-8 mL/kg) to 4-6 mL/kg may decrease barotrauma by decreasing ventilatory peak airway pressures and leads to improved respiratory recovery.  Hypercapnia (increased pCO2) sometimes needs to be tolerated in order to achieve these lower tidal volumes. The permissive hypercapnia leads to respiratory acidosis which might have negative side effects, but given that the patient is in ARDS, improving ventilatory function is more important.

Since hypoxemia is a major life-threatening condition and hypercapnia is not, one might choose to accept the latter. Hence the term, "permissive hypercapnia."

Altogether, the negative side effects of permissive hypercapnia may outweigh the benefits. For that reason, the implementation of extracorporeal CO2 removal (iLA Membrane Ventilator, Novalung) at an early stage of ARDS, has become a well established standard to allow for protective ventilation and avoid respiratory acidosis.

Symptoms
Symptoms of early hypercapnia (i.e. where PaCO2 is elevated but not extremely so) include flushed skin, full pulse, extrasystoles, muscle twitches, hand flaps, and possibly a raised blood pressure. In severe hypercapnia (generally PaCO2 greater than 10 kPa or 75 mmHg), symptomatology progresses to disorientation, panic, hyperventilation, convulsions, unconsciousness, and eventually death.

Other description about permissive hypercapnia in ARDS patient
Mechanical ventilation using high tidal volume (VT) and transpulmonary pressure can damage the lung, causing ventilator-induced lung injury. Permissive hypercapnia, a ventilatory strategy for acute respiratory failure in which the lungs are ventilated with a low inspiratory volume and pressure, has been accepted progressively in critical care for adult, pediatric, and neonatal patients requiring mechanical ventilation and is one of the central components of current protective ventilatory strategies.

See also
Acute respiratory distress syndrome
Mechanical ventilation

References
  
 

Intensive care medicine
Emergency medicine
Pulmonology